The RV  K. Piri Reis (full name Koca Piri Reis) is a Turkish multi purpose research vessel owned by Dokuz Eylül University in İzmir and operated by its Institute of Marine Sciences and Technology. Built in West Germany and launched in 1978, she was named in honor of the Ottoman naval captain and renowned cartographer Piri Reis.

Characteristics
K. Piri Reis was built in June 1978 at the Schiffswerft Diedrich Oldersum in West Germany.
MWM Suddeutsche Brimsen AG MWM TD 602 V12 diesel engine.

The ship's crew consists of 10 seamen, and she carries 11 scientists aboard. K. Piri Reis has an autonomous endurance of 20 days.

Scientific work
The ship is equipped with modern instruments and a laboratory to carry out research work in various fields like oceanography, marine biology, undersea geology, geophysics for oil and gas exploration and earthquake engineering.

Political dimension of her activity
The research activities performed by the vessel have sometimes beside its scientific and economic dimensions also political extent with diplomatic or military tone.

She was sent in 1987 to Aegean Sea after Greece announced that it will start oil and gas exploration in the region. As Greece declared to intervene, Turkey responded that this would be cause of war. The tension calmed down later with mediation efforts of NATO and the United States.

2011 Eastern Mediterranean mission
Following the decision of the Cyprus government to start an initiative for oil and gas exploration in the Mediterranean Sea, Turkey signed an agreement with Northern Cyprus to do the same within Northern Cyprus' territorial waters. For this purpose, K. Piri Reis, which was commissioned by the Turkish government to conduct research work, departed on September 23, 2011 from its homeport in Urla, İzmir Province and headed for Eastern Mediterranean.

See also
List of research vessels of Turkey

References

Research vessels of Turkey
1978 ships
Ships built in Germany
Dokuz Eylül University
Piri Reis